Henry Justin Allen  (September 11, 1868 – January 17, 1950) was an American politician serving as the 21st Governor of Kansas (1919–1923) and U.S. Senator from Kansas (1929–1930).

Life and career
Allen was born in Warren County, Pennsylvania, to John and Rebecca Elizabeth (Goodwin) Allen. In 1870, his family moved to Kansas, where it settled in Clay County.

Before becoming active in politics, Allen acquired ownership of newspapers throughout Kansas, beginning in 1894 with the Manhattan Nationalist in Manhattan, Kansas. He owned the Topeka State Journal with Arthur J. Carruth Jr. and William P. Snyder.  Generally forward-looking in his outlook, he hired Frank Lloyd Wright to design his home in Wichita, Kansas. Allen's home is the only residence designed by Wright in Kansas.

Allen was in France with William Allen White inspecting the facilities provided to Kansas soldiers of the American Expeditionary Force during World War I when his party nominated him for the office of governor. During the campaign in 1918, Allen never spent any of his own money and learned about his nomination from a Parisian newspaper. He served from 1919 to 1923.

Faced with a coal field strike in 1920, Allen pushed through the legislature a plan to prohibit strikes and send labor disputes to an industrial court. The court plan attracted nationwide interest; Allen debated American Federation of Labor president Samuel Gompers on the issue at Carnegie Hall in New York City on May 28, 1920. When publisher William Allen White objected to the court, Allen had him arrested. White won the 1923 Pulitzer Prize for his editorial "To an Anxious Friend," published July 27, 1922, opposing the law.

After leaving the governorship, Allen was U.S. Special Commissioner for Near East Relief in Armenia, Turkey, Greece, and Southern Russia. In 1928, he was Director of Publicity for the Republican National Committee.

In April 1929, he was appointed to the United States Senate to fill the vacancy caused when Charles Curtis resigned to become Vice President. Allen served from April 1, 1929, to November 30, 1930. He ran unsuccessfully for the remainder of Curtis' term, and was narrowly defeated by George McGill.

Allen died in 1950 following a cerebral thrombosis in Wichita, Kansas. He is buried at the Maple Grove Cemetery in Wichita.  Allen was posthumously inducted into the Kansas Newspaper Hall of Fame two years later.

References

External links
 

 Publications concerning Kansas Governor Allen's administration available via the KGI Online Library

|-

|-

|-

|-

1868 births
1950 deaths
People from Warren County, Pennsylvania
American people of Scottish descent
Methodists from Kansas
Washburn University School of Law alumni
Kansas Progressives (1912)
Republican Party United States senators from Kansas
Republican Party governors of Kansas
Deaths from cerebral thrombosis